Jimmy O'Brien (born 27 November 1996) is an Irish rugby union player who plays as a back with Leinster Rugby.

O'Brien was born in Eadestown in County Kildare, Ireland. He played in his school rugby with Newbridge College. Although he played fly-half at school, he moved to inside centre with the Leinster academy. His strengths in attack include a good kicking game, footwork, and passing, while in defence despite his lack of size he has a physical approach.

International
With the Irish sevens team he generally played at centre, but also filled in at fly-half. O'Brien played for Ireland at the 2018 Hong Kong Sevens qualifier, scoring four tries, but Ireland lost to Japan 7–12 in the semifinal and consequently failed to qualify as a core team for the 2018-19 World Series.  O'Brien played for Ireland on the London and Paris legs of the 2017-18 World Rugby Sevens Series; in those tournaments, despite its non-core status, Ireland surprised by finishing third and seventh respectively, with O'Brien scoring four tries across the two tournaments.

In February 2022 O'Brien was called up to the Ireland squad for the 2022 Six Nations Championship.
In June 2022, he was included in the Ireland squad for the 2022 tour of New Zealand.

On 4 November 2022, he was called up as a late bench replacement to the named squad to face South Africa in the first test of the Autumn Series, following an injury to Robbie Henshaw whose starting place was taken by replacement Stuart McCloskey. Following an injury to McCloskey in the first half, O'Brien made his test debut, playing 53 minutes in an Ireland victory.

References

External links

Leinster Profile
URC Profile

1996 births
Living people
Rugby union players from County Kildare
Irish rugby union players
Leinster Rugby players
University College Dublin R.F.C. players
Ireland international rugby sevens players
Rugby union centres
Rugby union wings
Rugby union fullbacks
Ireland international rugby union players